Janeesa "Chucky" Jeffery (born May 8, 1991) is a professional basketball player who last played for the New York Liberty of the WNBA. She played college basketball at the University of Colorado.

Colorado  statistics

Source

References

External links
Colorado bio

Living people
1991 births
American women's basketball players
Basketball players from Colorado Springs, Colorado
Colorado Buffaloes women's basketball players
Guards (basketball)
Minnesota Lynx draft picks
New York Liberty players